is a Japanese potter.

Biography 
Hosokawa was born in Tokyo in 1972 as the son of Morihiro Hosokawa, the former Prime Minister of Japan.  He was raised in Kumamoto.  After studying at junior high school, he went to the United States where he studied at high school and university.  After returning to Japan, he transferred to another university in Tokyo.  He then studied photography, worked at various part-time jobs and traveled to India.

Hosokawa studied at the kiln in Iga under Masatake Fukumori in 1999.  He also collaborated with his father in Yugawara.  He opened his own kiln in 2006.  In 2008, Hosokawa made his first solo exhibition at Shibunkaku in Kyoto and made subsequent exhibitions there, including one in 2013.  He also made exhibitions at the Kakiden Gallery in Shinjuku, Nanohana in Odawara, Mitsukoshi Department Store in Nihonbashi, Tsuruya Department Store in Kumamoto and Tenmaya in Okamoto as well as others.  Hosokawa made further studies under Fukumori in 2014 and worked in Raku ware at Yugawara.  Along with Fukumori, he visited the United Kingdom in May 2017 to test the clay and a newly built kiln.

Personal life 
Morimitsu is married to Ai Hosokawa since 2009. They live in Kumamoto with their daughter.

Ancestry

References 

1972 births
Living people
Higo-Hosokawa clan
Japanese potters
People from Tokyo